The 1994–95 season was Manchester City's sixth consecutive season in the top tier of English football, and their third in the Premier League.

Season summary
Manchester City endured another torrid season which saw them struggle. Their goalscoring rate improving dramatically from 36 to 53, but they slipped one place into 17th - though still enough to achieve survival. But it was too late to save manager Brian Horton's job and he was sacked to make way for Alan Ball of Southampton.

Key striker Niall Quinn recovered from a serious knee injury but failed to make an impact on City's dismal showing, though new German striker Uwe Rösler was among the Premiership's top target men with 15 league goals. His strike partner Paul Walsh was also a frequent goalscorer, with 12 Premiership strikes.

One of the few things that gave City fans something to look forward to was the emergence of exciting young players like Garry Flitcroft, Richard Edghill and Steve Lomas. The close season arrival of Georgian midfielder Georgi Kinkladze was another exciting prospect which suggested that the dark clouds that had recently hung over Maine Road might not have cast too lengthy a shadow.

Team kit
The team kit was produced by Umbro and the shirt sponsor was Brother.

True products of the nineties, the home and away kits used in the 1994–95 season were over-designed, with the away kit in particular leaving a legacy as being one of the worst kits of Premier League history. The home kit, while on the face of it a classic plain blue shirt with white shorts, in fact had a pattern inlaid in such a way as was only visible when caught by the light, which contained oversized angular Umbro diamonds over the top of each other across the front of the shirt. The away kit was intended as a tribute to the classic red and black stripes which City had worn as an away kit on a number of occasions previously, but for no apparent reason had two-tone grey shoulder stripes as well as an embossed shield which was more suited to the shape of the club's badge after its redesign in 1997 (by which point the shirt was no longer being worn) than the circular badge of the time. The third kit was a more simple white kit with dark blue pinstripes and matching shorts.

Final league table

Results summary

Results by round

Results
Manchester City's score comes first

Legend

FA Premier League

FA Cup

League Cup

Squad

Left club during season

Reserve squad

Transfers

In

Out

Transfers in:  £1,530,000
Transfers out:  £2,250,000
Total spending:  £720,000

Statistics

Starting 11
Considering only Premier League starts

References
 Manchester City squad for 1994–95 season

Manchester City F.C. seasons
Manchester City